The China Jinping Underground Laboratory is a deep underground laboratory in the Jinping Mountains of Sichuan, China. The cosmic ray rate in the laboratory is under 0.2 muons/m2/day, placing the lab at a depth of 6720 m.w.e. and making it the best-shielded underground laboratory in the world.

Although the marble through which the tunnels are dug is considered "hard rock", at the great depth it presents greater geotechnical engineering challenges than the even harder igneous rocks in which other deep laboratories are constructed.  The  water pressure in the rock is also inconvenient.  But marble has the advantage for radiation shielding of being low in radionuclides, such as 40K, 226Ra, 232Th, and 238U.  This in turn leads to low levels of radon (222Rn) in the atmosphere.

History
The Jinping-II Dam hydroelectric power project involved excavating a number of large tunnels under the Jinping Mountains: four large  headrace tunnels carrying water east, two  vehicular access tunnels, and one water drainage tunnel. Hearing of the excavation in August 2008, physicists at Tsinghua University determined that it would be an excellent location for a deep underground laboratory, and negotiated with the hydropower company to excavate laboratory space in the middle of the tunnels.

A formal agreement was signed on 8 May 2009, and excavation was promptly started. The first phase CJPL-I, consisting of a  main hall, plus  of access tunnel (4,000 m3 total excavation) was excavated by May 2010, and construction completed 12 June 2010. A formal laboratory inauguration was held 12 December 2010.

The laboratory is to the south of the southernmost of the seven parallel tunnels, traffic tunnel A.

The air ventilation in CJPL-I was initially inadequate, resulting in the accumulation of dust on the equipment and radon gas in the air until additional ventilation was installed.

A more difficult problem is that the walls of CJPL-I were lined with ordinary concrete taken from the hydroelectric project's supply.  This has a natural radioactivity higher than desirable for a low-background laboratory.  The second phase of construction uses materials selected for low radioactivity.

CJPL-II expansion
The laboratory is currently undergoing a major (50-fold) expansion.  The first phase was rapidly filled, and plans for a second were made quickly, before the excavation workers and equipment departed following completion of the hydroelectric project in 2014.

They are sloped criss-crossing tunnels which connect the midpoints of the five water tunnels (four headrace and one drainage) to the road tunnels beside and slightly above them. Totalling , and originally intended to be blocked off after construction, they have been donated to the laboratory and will be used for support facilities.

(This is somewhat behind expectations that they would be ready for occupation in January 2017.)

When complete, it will be the world's largest underground laboratory, surpassing the current record-holder the Laboratori Nazionali del Gran Sasso (LNGS).

CJPL's halls also enclose more volume than those of LNGS.

CJPL's total volume of  would suggest that CJPL is twice the size, but that would be misleading; all of LNGS's excavation was designed to be a laboratory, and thus can be used more efficiently than CJPL's repurposed tunnels.

Thanks to the laboratory's location within a major hydroelectric facility, additional electrical power is readily available.  CJPL-II is supplied by two redundant 10 kV,  power cables; available power is temporarily limited by the 5×250 kVA step-down transformers in the laboratory (one per experiment hall, and a fifth for facilities).  There is likewise no shortage of water for cooling high-powered equipment.

The muon flux in (and thus water equivalent depth of) CJPL-II is currently being measured, and may differ slightly from CJPL-I, but it will certainly remain lower than SNOLAB in Canada and thus retain the record for the world's deepest laboratory as well.

Experiments
Experiments currently operating in CJPL are:
 China Dark Matter Experiment (CDEX), a germanium dark matter detector,
 PandaX, the Particle and Astrophysical Xenon Detector for dark matter (and neutrinoless double beta decay), and
 A 1-ton prototype of the planned 100-ton Jinping Neutrino Experiment, an experiment taking advantage of CJPL's location far from nuclear reactors, and thus having the lowest flux of reactor neutrinos of any underground laboratory, to do precision measurements of solar- and geoneutrinos.

Also operating in the laboratory is a low background facility using a high purity germanium detector, for measuring very low levels of radioactivity.  This is not a physics experiment itself, but tests materials intended for use in the experiments.  It also tests materials used to construct CJPL-II.

Experiments currently planned for CJPL-II are:
 a larger, tonne-scale version of CDEX,
 a larger, tonne-scale version of PandaX,
 Jinping Underground Nuclear Astrophysics (JUNA), an experiment to measure the rates of astrophysically important stellar nuclear reactions, and
 a possible liquid argon dark matter detector.

Proposals also exist for:
 CUPID (CUORE Upgrade with Particle Identification), a neutrinoless double beta decay experiment, and
 a directional dark matter detector by the MIMAC (MIcro-tpc MAtrix of Chambers) collaboration, as a follow-on to their detector currently operating at the Modane Underground Laboratory.

Notes

References

External links
 CJPL home page (Tsinghua University)
 Jinping Neutrino Experiment home page (Tsinghua University)
 CJPL GitHub page
 Symposium on Future Applications of Germanium Detectors in Fundamental Research in Beijing, with multiple CJPL presentations
 A Town Meeting for the 2nd-phase Development of the China Jinping Underground Laboratory (Sept. 8, 2013) at the 13th International Conference on Topics in Astroparticle and Underground Physics
 CJPL 2015 conference presentations 

Underground laboratories
Laboratories in China
Buildings and structures in Sichuan